Avicephala ("bird heads") is an extinct, potentially polyphyletic grouping of diapsid reptiles that lived during the Late Permian and Triassic periods characterised by superficially bird-like skulls and arboreal lifestyles. As a clade, Avicephala is defined as including the gliding weigeltisaurids and the arboreal drepanosaurs to the exclusion of other major diapsid groups. This relationship is not recovered in the majority of phylogenetic analyses of early diapsids and so Avicephala is typically regarded as an unnatural grouping. However, the clade was recovered again in 2021 in a redescription of Weigeltisaurus, raising the possibility that the clade may be valid after all.

Description

Avicephalans were named in reference to their pointed, lightly constructed, superficially bird-like skulls. The resemblance is especially striking in some drepanosaurs such as Avicranium which possess toothless beaks, forward-facing eyes and large, rounded craniums. These superficial similarities to birds led some scientists to hypothesise that birds were derived from various avicephalians, although the well established relationship of birds to theropod dinosaurs indicates that these similarities arose only through convergent evolution.

Although bird-like in some respects, avicephalans also possess a variety of archaic and unique characteristics as well, including some associated with an arboreal lifestyle. Drepanosaurs possess a suite of chameleon-like skeletal features, such as opposable digits on the hands and feet and prehensile tails—tipped with a bony hook in some species like Drepanosaurus. Weigeltisaurids on the other hand possessed wing-like gliding membranes (patagia) supported by elongated bony rods along their bodies, novel structures analogous to ribs of the modern gliding Draco lizard. Weigeltisaurids also had toes that were similarly proportioned to living arboreal lizards. Although both groups are highly derived, they do share some similarities, namely they have relatively unossified skeletons lacking intercentra between their vertebrae, as well as proportionately tall, thin shoulder blades.

The enigmatic Triassic reptile Longisquama was initially included as an Avicephalian when the clade was first defined as a relative of Coelurosauravus. However, due to the limited knowledge of its anatomy, Longisquama has been excluded from many subsequent phylogenetic analyses as its true relationships are difficult to discern.

History of classification

The phylogenetic relationships of both drepanosaurs and weigeltisaurs, as well as Longisquama, have historically been difficult to pin down. Drepanosaurs and weigeltisaurids were first suggested to form a clade together by John Merck in an abstract presented to the 2003 annual meeting of the Society of Vertebrate Paleontology. The same conclusion would be reached by Phil Senter in a paper in 2004, who named this clade Avicephala and found it to be the sister taxon to Neodiapsida (defined wherein as the clade containing "Younginiforms" and all living diapsids).

Within Avicephala, Senter found two clades, one that he named Simiosauria (equivalent to Drepanosauromorpha), and another containing Coelurosauravus and Longisquama. The cladogram below depicts the result of his analysis:

Later research, including Renesto and Binelli (2006) and Renesto et al. (2010), argued that the phylogenetic analysis of Senter (2004) was flawed due to the absence of available data for drepanosaur skulls at the time and the exclusion of particular diapsid groups, such as pterosaurs. Renesto and colleagues (2010) recommended abandoning Avicephala for these reasons (as well as defining a new clade, Drepanosauromorpha, to replace Simiosauria following the guidelines of the PhyloCode). They instead found drepanosauromorphs to be archosauromorphs, possibly related to Prolacertiformes, and unrelated to weigeltisaurids or other early diapsids.Drepanosauromorphs would later be demonstrated to be early-diverging diapsids after all following the description of the three-dimensionally preserved skull of Avicranium in 2017, revealing archaic features of their skull anatomy. Still, drepanosaurs and weigeltisaurids remained as separate lineages in the study's phylogenetic analysis, with each being successively closer to living diapsids.

Avicephalia would not be recovered again until 2021 following the redescription of Weigeltisaurus by Adam Pritchard and colleagues, wherein the phylogenetic analysis found a clade of drepanosauromorphs and weigeltisaurids. They identified four unambiguous synapomorphies (shared unique traits) for Avicephalia: the absence of both cervical and dorsal intercentra, a length/height ratio for the scapula between 0.4 and 0.25, and no outer process on the fifth metatarsal. They also updated Senter's definition of Avicephala, as the modern definition of Neodiapsida now includes both drepanosaurs and weigeltisaurids. Avicephalia is now defined as "including all taxa more closely related to Weigeltisaurus jaekeli Weigelt 1930 and Drepanosaurus unguicaudatus Pinna 1979 than to Petrolacosaurus kansensis Lane 1945, Orovenator mayorum Reisz, Modesto & Scott, 2011, Claudiosaurus germaini Carroll, 1978, Youngina capensis Broom 1914, or Sauria Macartney 1802".

Despite this result, they noted that should Avicephala turn out to not be monophyletic in future analyses they recommend that the taxon be abandoned once again. The cladogram of their results is shown below:

References

Avicephalans
Neodiapsids
Reptile taxonomy
Permian diapsids
Triassic diapsids